William Sasso (born May 24, 1975) is a Canadian actor, comedian and podcaster. He is notable for his five seasons as a cast member on Mad TV from 1997 to 2002, for starring as Curly in the 2012 film reboot of The Three Stooges, and as Mover #1 in Happy Gilmore (1996). He is also known for his TV roles as Carl Monari in Less than Perfect (2003–2006), Doug Martin in How I Met Your Mother (2008–2012), and Bill Ryan in United We Fall (2020).

Early life
William Sasso was born on May 24, 1975, in Ladner, British Columbia, to Italian immigrant parents.

Career

MADtv
By the end of its second season (1996–1997), the Fox network sketch comedy television series MADtv experienced its first big cast turnover. Three of the show's repertory performers (Bryan Callen, Orlando Jones and Artie Lange) left the cast. As a result, in 1997, casting executives at Fox had to cast replacements for the show. Sasso (along with Alex Borstein and Aries Spears) was selected to join the MADtv third-season cast as a regular cast member.

2002 – present
After leaving MADtv, Sasso's television appearances included four seasons as Carl Monari on Less than Perfect, as well as a role in Robson Arms. He played the role of Fortunio Balducci in Southland Tales.

Sasso hosted the 2006 Canadian Comedy Awards in London, Ontario, as well as the festival's "Sketch & Improv Showcases". Additionally, he was a host at the 2005-2006 NHL award ceremony. Sasso appeared on the CSI episode "The Chick Chop Flick Shop". He also appeared in the Childrens Hospital episode "Frankfurters".

Sasso starred in $h*! My Dad Says, based on the Twitter feed Shit My Dad Says, created by Justin Halpern. The show premiered in the late 2010 and its cancellation was announced on May 15, 2011.

Sasso began posting videos on the online video service Vine, creating a running gag of him violently vomiting lemons without warning.

In 2018, Sasso played Mountie Archambault in the comedy film Super Troopers 2. In November 2019, he voiced Mr. Ellingboe in Netflix's Klaus.

Filmography

Film

Television

Music video

Web series

References

External links
 

1975 births
20th-century Canadian comedians
21st-century Canadian comedians
20th-century Canadian male actors
21st-century Canadian male actors
Canadian impressionists (entertainers)
Canadian sketch comedians
Canadian male comedians
Canadian male film actors
Canadian male television actors
Canadian male voice actors
Canadian people of Italian descent
Living people
Male actors from British Columbia
People from Delta, British Columbia